Thomas Schroll (born 26 November 1965) is an Austria former bobsledder who competed from the late-1980s to the mid-1990s. He won a gold medal in the four-men event with teammates Ingo Appelt, Harald Winkler and Gerhard Haidacher at the 1992 Winter Olympics of Albertville. Schroll also finished fourth in the two-man event with Appelt at those same games.

Schroll also won a silver medal in the four-man event at the 1995 FIBT World Championships in Winterberg.

References
Bobsleigh four-man Olympic medalists for 1924, 1932-56, and since 1964
Bobsleigh four-man world championship medalists since 1930
DatabaseOlympics.com profile

1965 births
Living people
Austrian male bobsledders
Bobsledders at the 1992 Winter Olympics
Bobsledders at the 1994 Winter Olympics
Olympic bobsledders of Austria
Olympic gold medalists for Austria
Olympic medalists in bobsleigh
Medalists at the 1992 Winter Olympics